Abercrombie & Fitch (A&F) is an American lifestyle retailer that focuses on casual wear. Its headquarters are in New Albany, Ohio. The company operates three other offshoot brands: Abercrombie Kids, Hollister Co., and Gilly Hicks. As of February 2020, the company operated 854 stores across all brands.

Once known for its ad campaigns mostly featuring nearly-nude teen models behaving in sexually suggestive ways with each other, the company has toned down sexually charged imagery and no longer features scantily dressed models in its advertisements. According to then-Chairman Arthur Martinez (in 2016), these changes were implemented to show that the company is evolving with its consumers.

History

The original Abercrombie & Fitch was founded in 1892 in  New York City by David T. Abercrombie as an outfitter for the elite outdoorsman. Ezra Fitch—a wealthy lawyer, real estate developer, and devoted Abercrombie customer—bought a significant stake in the business in 1900.  In 1904, it was incorporated and renamed "Abercrombie & Fitch Co."  Fitch eventually bought out Abercrombie's share of the business, becoming its sole owner from 1907 to 1928.  The company was an elite outfitter of sporting and excursion goods, particularly noted for its expensive shotguns, fishing rods, fishing boats, and tents At one time, it had outfitted Theodore Roosevelt's safari and Adm. Richard E. Byrd's expedition to Antarctica.  Ernest Hemingway was also a regular customer; the gun with which he committed suicide in 1961 was purchased from Abercrombie and Fitch. Following Hemingway's death, his wife placed several of his guns on consignment with the company.

By the 1970s, A&F was struggling to compete with lower priced competitors while trying to maintain its high-end image.  It was known for holding an extensive inventory of lavish items, but high operating expenses forced A&F to shed its highest priced items, such as an $18,000 gold and onyx chess set.  Cash flow problems forced the company to also cut its inventory of moderately-priced products.

In 1976, Abercrombie & Fitch filed for Chapter 11 bankruptcy protection. In 1977, the company closed its New York flagship store at Madison Avenue and East 45th Street.

While Abercrombie & Fitch went out of business during its bankruptcy, the brand survived: in 1978, Oshman's Sporting Goods, a Houston-based retail chain, bought the defunct firm's name and mailing list for $1.5 million (equivalent to $ million in ). Oshman's relaunched the company as a mail-order retailer specializing in hunting wear and novelty items. Retail stores were also opened in Beverly Hills, Dallas, and (by the mid-1980s) New York City.

In 1988, Oshman's sold the brand and its operations to Columbus, Ohio-based The Limited (parent company of several retail clothing chains, including Victoria's Secret). Under The Limited (which later rebranded itself as L Brands), A&F gradually shifted its focus to young adults, was later spun off as a separate, publicly traded company, and eventually grew into one of the largest apparel firms in the United States.

Since 1997, A&F has kept a high profile in ways both positive (ads, brand expansions, philanthropy) and problematic (legal conflicts, boycotts, ads, clothing style controversies, employment practices). Mike Jeffries became CEO in the 1990s and refocused the brand on the teen customer. In 1998, the company built on its success by launching a children's product line, Abercrombie Kids, for 7-14 year olds. By 1999, A&F was more popular than ever. In 2000, A&F launched its Hollister Co. subsidiary, "a new concept focused on the optimistic, laidback California lifestyle".

A&F encountered headwinds again in the first decade of the 21st century, when the Great Recession battered the company's business as teenagers turned to high-style/low-price "fast fashion" brands like H&M and Forever 21 for their clothing.

2007–present 
The company's stock price dropped from an all-time high of $84.23 in October 2007, to a low of $14.64 in November 2008.  The company overhauled its merchandise mix and closed underperforming stores; however, lackluster financial performance has continued. Longtime CEO Michael Jeffries resigned in December 2014, after 22 years with the company. Fran Horowitz took over as CEO in February 2017.

To combat heavy competition from fast-fashion rivals like Forever 21 and H&M, A&F announced key changes to its image. A&F pledged to reduce the sexually charged style of its advertising and instead focus more on customer service and diversity in staffing. Among the changes announced were the elimination of its iconic-yet-controversial sexualized marketing, no longer having groups of shirtless male models at new store openings, and eliminating sexualized imagery on bags, gift cards, and stores fixtures. A&F also changed the job title of store employees from "models" to "brand representatives", and allowed a less tightly controlled, more individualistic dress code. Additionally, A&F declared that "brand representatives" would focus more on customer service (by offering to help serve customers), versus the past policy of displaying aloofness toward them. They also aimed to promote more diversity among store employees and executives.

In 2015, the company signaled that it would be implementing changes quickly. By that May, the changes were apparent in stores. All "permanent marketing" images at the cash wrap and fitting rooms were removed, and store models were no longer dressed in Abercrombie-branded clothes.

According to recent reports from Q1 2021, it was the "group’s best second-quarter operating income and margin since 2008, with sales exceeding pre-pandemic levels."

In April 2022, Netflix released a documentary entitled, White Hot: The Rise & Fall of Abercrombie & Fitch directed by Alison Klayman. The documentary explores the reign of Abercrombie & Fitch in the late 1990s and early 2000s, discussing its past transgressions and exclusionary practices.

Market value 
In April 2017, the company was described by Standard & Poor's as having a market value of $650 million and about $420 million cash on hand. In May 2017, the company was in talks to sell itself. Potential buyers included rivals Express (a fellow former L Brands subsidiary) and American Eagle Outfitters, and private equity firm Cerberus Capital Management. However, negotiations failed by early July, contributing to a 21% drop in A&F's stock price.

Headquarters
The company's headquarters (aka "The Home Office") is located outside Columbus, Ohio in New Albany, Ohio (a wealthy community planned and built by L Brands founder Leslie "Les" Wexner). The Home Office was designed as a campus and internally referred to as such, sitting on 350-acres and consisting of 11 two-story buildings (some connected by skybridge). The company's two merchandise distribution centers (1 million square feet each) are located on campus to help ensure brand protection. Also on campus are model stores, one for each of the company's brands, where store layouts, merchandising and atmosphere are developed and tested. In January 2017, A&F announced it was terminating 150 Home Office employees.

The company also has a European office in Mendrisio, Switzerland.

Marketing, advertising and brand identity

A&F was once known for its racy marketing photography by Bruce Weber. It was black and white and set outdoors, usually with partially nude males and females for an increased tone of sexuality. The company promotes its casting sessions, models, and photo shoots in the "A&F Casting" feature on its website. The website also provides a gallery of current photography. Framed copies at company stores will sometimes name the model and store.

The company's brand image is heavily promoted as an international near-luxury lifestyle concept. The company began cultivating an upscale image after the 2005 opening of its Fifth Avenue flagship store alongside Prada and other upscale retailers. Having for years used high-grade materials in the manufacture of its merchandise, and pricing them at "near-luxury" levels, the company introduced the trademark Casual Luxury as a fictional dictionary term with multiple definitions such as "[using] the finest cashmere, pima cottons, and highest quality leather to create the ultimate in casual, body conscious clothing," and "implementing and/or incorporating time honored machinery ...to produce the most exclusive denim..." This upscale image has allowed it to open stores in international high-end locations and further promote the image by pricing its merchandise at almost double the American prices.

Echoing the entertainment-based, high-class-aspirational approach L Brands' Les Wexner used to fuel the 1980s-2010s growth of Victoria's Secret, Abercrombie CEO Mike Jeffries has called A&F's brand image a "movie" because of the "fantasy" that plays out in-store.

Following a dismal earnings announcement in August 2014, A&F ended its logo-branded apparel line, arguing that element of its brand no longer resonated with its target market. A&F also shifted its business strategy to trendier styles and faster production processes, effectively embracing fast fashion. Some experts argue the retailer's focus on class-driven exclusivity caused it to fall out of favor with its target market.

In 2018, Abercrombie shifted its target market to an older demographic (ages 21–24). Since 2018, Abercrombie has closed many of its larger flagship locations to open smaller, brighter-colored new stores designed to keep customers interested amid the rise of e-commerce rivals.

Store staff

The company is noted for its use of "brand representatives" (fka "models") as in-store customer service staff. Previously, the models were required to buy and wear only A&F clothing at work. However, after a 2003 settlement with California state labor regulators, A&F allowed brand reps to wear any logo-free clothing, as long as it corresponded with the season and A&F's style. The California settlement also provided $2.2 million to reimburse former employees for their forced purchases of company-branded clothing. An "Impact Team" was created in 2004 to control merchandise within each store and strictly maintain and enforce company standards. Bigger and higher volume stores have a "Full Time Stock" who trains Impact associates, processes shipments, maintains stock room standards, and can even act as a manager if the store is short on management staff. Stores' general manager and assistant managers are responsible for forms, lighting, photo marketing, fragrance presentations, and ensuring brand reps comply with the company's "look policy".

Products

Women's Wear Daily calls the company's clothing classically "neo-preppy", with an "edgy tone and imagery".
The company's fashions have a reputation for luxury, with the majority of designs trend-driven. There is heavy promotion of "Premium Jeans". In early 2010, the company introduced a leather handbag collection inspired by designs from Ruehl.

Its prices are recognized as the highest in the youth-clothing industry. Internationally, prices are almost double those in American stores. Retail analyst Chris Boring warns that the company's brands are a "little more susceptible" should recession hit, because their specialties are premium-priced goods rather than necessities. Indeed, as the late-2000s recession continued, the company noticeably suffered financially for its refusal to lower prices or offer discounts. It argued that doing so would "cheapen" its near-luxury image. Analyst Bruce Watson warned that the company risked finding itself transformed into "a cautionary tale of a store that was left by the wayside when it declined to change with the times".  The company's year-to-year revenue, a key indicator of a retailer's health, rose 13% in September 2010, aided by strong international sales.

The company has carried men's fragrances Fierce, Colden, and has re-branded the original cologne Woods (Christmas Floorset 2010). Women's fragrances have included 8, Perfume 41, Wakely, and Perfume #1. Fierce and 8 are the most heavily marketed fragrances, as they are the signature scents of the brand overall.

Product criticism
In 2002, the company sold a shirt featuring the slogan "Wong Brothers Laundry ServiceTwo Wongs Can Make It White," with smiling figures in conical Asian hats, an offensive depiction of 19th century Chinese immigrants to the U.S. A&F discontinued the designs and apologized after a boycott started by a Stanford University Asian American student group. That same year, Abercrombie Kids removed a line of thong underwear sold for girls in pre-teen children's sizes after parents mounted nationwide storefront protests. The underwear included phrases like "Eye Candy" and "Wink Wink" printed on the front.

More T-shirt controversies occurred in 2004. The first incident involved a shirt featuring the phrase, "It's All Relative in West Virginia," playing on the trope that incestuous relationships are supposedly common in rural America. West Virginia Governor Bob Wise spoke out against the company for depicting "an unfounded, negative stereotype of West Virginia", but A&F did not remove the shirts. Later, another T-shirt that read "L is for Loser" next to a picture of a male gymnast (implying that male participation in female-dominated sporting activities makes such males less "masculine") gathered publicity. A&F stopped selling the shirt in October 2004 after USA Gymnastics president Bob Colarossi announced a boycott for mocking the sport.

In 2005, the Women and Girls Foundation of Southwest Pennsylvania launched a "Girlcott" of the store to protest the sale of T-shirts displaying messages such as "Who needs brains when you have these?", "Available for parties," and "I had a nightmare I was a brunette." The campaign received national coverage on The Today Show, and the company pulled the shirts from stores on November 5, 2005. Five days after this media coverage, the company pulled two of the shirts from its shelves, released an apology to girls for producing the T-shirts, and agreed to have corporate executives meet with the "Girlcott" girls at the company's headquarters.

Bob Jones University, a private, Protestant university in Greenville, South Carolina, its affiliated pre-collegiate schools, and some other Christian colleges, banned A&F (and Hollister) clothing from being "worn, carried, or displayed" on its campuses because of "an unusual degree of antagonism to the name of Christ and an unusual display of wickedness" in the company's promotions.

After the company raised its prices in 2004, its products have been described as overpriced.

A T-shirt controversy arose again over the company's Back-to-School 2009 collection of "humor tees". One shirt proclaims "Show the twins" above a picture of a young woman with her blouse open to two men. Two other shirts state "Female streaking encouraged" and "Female Students Wanted for Sexual Research". The American Family Association disapproved of the influence of the "sex-as-recreation" lifestyle shirts, and asked the brand to remove its "sexualized shirts" from display.

Brand protection
Because of extensive counterfeiting of its products, the company launched a brand protection program in 2006 to combat the problem worldwide (focusing more on China, Hong Kong, Japan and Korea) by working with law enforcement globally. The program is headed by a former FBI Supervisory Special Agent who was part of the FBI's Intellectual Property Rights program, and covers all the company's brands. The company says that the program "will improve current practices and strategies by focusing on eliminating the supply of illicit Abercrombie & Fitch products."

In August 2011, the company offered Mike "The Situation" Sorrentino and other cast members of the MTV reality show Jersey Shore a "substantial payment" if they stopped wearing Abercrombie-branded clothes, stating "We are deeply concerned that Mr. Sorrentino's association with our brand could cause significant damage to our image." In November 2011, Sorrentino filed a lawsuit against the company after it allegedly violated his copyrights in making shirts that said "The Fitchuation" and "GTL...You Know The Deal". The case was dismissed in July 2013.

Jeffries' 2006 target demographic quote
In 2013, a 2006 Salon interview with then-CEO Mike Jeffries went viral, causing public backlash against A&F's marketing practices. Jeffries comments – that his brand is only suitable for "the good-looking, cool kids," and that there are people who do not belong in his clothes, namely, overweight people – came under fire.

These quotes, which were the basis for the article's "youth, sex and casual superiority" headline, went largely unnoticed when the article was published in 2006, until they resurfaced in May 2013 after actor Kirstie Alley brought them up in an Entertainment Tonight interview, and prominent daytime talk-show host Ellen DeGeneres spoke out against the company.

Jeffries issued an official statement on May 17, 2013, regarding the news articles, saying, "I want to address some of my comments that have been circulating from a 2006 interview. While I believe this seven-year-old, resurrected quote has been taken out of context, I sincerely regret that my choice of words was interpreted in a manner that has caused offense." He also stated, "We are completely opposed to any discrimination, bullying, derogatory characterizations or other anti-social behavior based on race, gender, body type or other individual characteristics."

Stores

The exterior of the contemporary store design features white molding and formerly black louvers. From 2013 to 2014, the louvers were removed from all locations except flagship stores. The company stated that the louvers were removed in an effort to eliminate the exclusive atmosphere from stores and to experiment with window marketing. The currently featured marketing image directly faces the entrance. The interior is lit with dim ceiling lights and spot lighting. Electronic dance music meant to create an upbeat atmosphere may be played at sound levels as high as 90 decibels, exceeding the corporate policy of 84 decibels and comparable to heavy construction machinery and harmful to the ears.

The company operates 1,049 stores across all four brands. The company's brand has 278 locations in the United States, 5 in Canada (2 in Alberta, 2 in Ontario, and 1 in British Columbia).  The company currently operates 25 full-line stores and 4 outlet stores across 16 countries.

International expansion
 
 
The company's brand is believed to have reached its maximum growth potential in the American market. International expansion began in 2005, with the long-term goal of opening flagships for A&F (and eventually all its brands), in high-profile locations worldwide "at a deliberate pace".  After initially opening at a deliberately slow pace, the company began to accelerate international expansion for its namesake and its Hollister Co. brand in 2012.

The company's first non-U.S. stores opened in Toronto and Edmonton in 2005, and then expanded to other major cities in Canada. The company first entered the European market in 2007 with the opening of its flagship London store at 7 Burlington Gardens, Savile Row.  Since then, the company has opened stores in Milan, Copenhagen, Paris, Madrid, Brussels, Dublin (now closed) and other major cities in Europe, including six stores in Germany. The company opened its first Asian flagship store in Tokyo in 2009, followed by Fukuoka, Singapore, Hong Kong and Seoul.  The company would primarily focus on the Chinese and Japanese markets where luxury consumption is high.  The company has also entered a franchise agreement with Grupo AXO to open retail stores in Mexico by 2015. In 2015, the company entered the Middle Eastern market with the opening of its flagship store in Kuwait. Since then the company has opened locations in Dubai and plans to expand deeper into the Middle East with stores in Saudi Arabia, Qatar, Bahrain, and Oman.

Remembrance poppy prohibition in the UK
In November 2010, the Southampton, England, store prevented 18-year-old Harriet Phipps from wearing a remembrance poppy, which is worn as part of the Remembrance Day commemorations in the United Kingdom and Canada every November.  The official reason for the refusal was reported to be that the poppy is not considered part of the corporate approved uniform, and is therefore prohibited.  The ban drew criticisms, and on November 8 the company posted on its Facebook page the following statement: "As an American company that has been around since 1892, we appreciate the sacrifices of the British and American servicemen/women in the World Wars and in military conflicts that continue today. Our company policy is to allow associates to wear a poppy as a token of this appreciation on Remembrance Day. Going forward, ...we will revisit this policy to the days/weeks leading up to Remembrance Day."

Abercrombie Kids shop on Savile Row
In 2012, the company announced plans that it would open its Abercrombie Kids shop at No. 3 on Savile Row, next door to Gieves & Hawkes.  The plans drew criticism and opposition from the tailors of the Row, who were already unhappy about the presence of its main store on Burlington Gardens at the end of the Row to begin with. This eventually led to a protest organized by The Chap magazine on April 23, 2012. During the consultation period, objections were lodged to Westminster City Council and in February 2013 the Council rejected many of the company's proposals for the store, and branded the entire plans "utterly unacceptable." A&F appealed, managed to overcome the obstacles and opened the store in September 2014. The following year, the company was subject to nearly £16,000 in fines and legal costs when it was ruled that changes it had made to the Grade II-listed building were illegal.

Abercrombie opens college campus stores 
In an attempt to more effectively reach the brand's ideal "college-age" customer, the company opened two campus stores in August 2018, both of which have since closed.

Brands
The company has operated four concept brands apart from its namesake over the years; they have been referred to as subsidiaries, but operate as divisions under the company's umbrella.

Abercrombie Kids Prep-school by Abercrombie & Fitch Themed as "classic cool" for kids 7 through 14, this is the children's version of Abercrombie & Fitch.

Hollister Co. Southern California by Abercrombie & Fitch Themed after "SoCal" for teenagers 14 through 18, with significantly lower prices than its parent brand.

Gilly Hicks The cheeky cousin of Abercrombie & Fitch Themed after "Down Under" Sydney, offers underwear, loungewear and activewear for women 18 and up. Currently sold primarily within Hollister Co. stores and e-commerce channels with a small number of individual store locations.

Ruehl No.925 Post-Grad by Abercrombie & Fitch Themed after a fictional Greenwich Village heritage, offered clothes for 22 through 35 post-grads. Closed in 2010.

Social Tourist “Social Tourist is the creative vision of Hollister, the teen brand liberating the spirit of an endless summer, and social media personalities Charli and Dixie D’Amelio. The lifestyle brand creates trend forward apparel that allows teens to experiment with their style, while exploring the duality of who they are both on social media and in real life.“

Legal issues
The company has been involved in legal conflicts over its employment practices, treatment of customers, and clothing styles.

Employment practices

In a 2004 lawsuit González v. Abercrombie & Fitch, the company was accused of discriminating against African Americans, Latinos, Asian Americans, and women by preferentially offering floor sales positions (called Brand Representatives before the settlement and Models after) and store management positions to Caucasian males. The company agreed to a settlement of the class-action suit, which required the company to (1) pay $40 million to African Americans, Latinos, Asian Americans, and women who applied and were not hired or worked in certain store positions, (2) revise its hiring, performance measurement, and promotion policies, (3) revise its internal complaint procedures, (4) appoint a Vice President of Diversity, (5) hire 25 recruiters to seek out minority applicants, (6) discontinue the practice of recruiting employees at primarily white fraternities and sororities, (7) include more minorities in marketing materials, (8) report to a neutral court-appointed monitor twice per year regarding its progress in those areas, and (9) report to the court once per year.

In June 2009, British law student Riam Dean, who had worked at the company's flagship store in London's Savile Row, took the company to an employment tribunal. Dean, who was born without a left forearm, claimed that although she was initially given special permission to wear clothing that covered her prosthetic limb, she was soon told that her appearance breached the company's "Look Policy" and sent to work in the stock room, out of sight of customers. Dean sued the company for disability discrimination, and sought up to £20,000 in damages. In August 2009, the tribunal ruled the 22-year-old was wrongfully dismissed and unlawfully harassed. She was awarded £8,013 for loss of earnings and wrongful dismissal.

In a lawsuit filed in September 2009, Equal Employment Opportunity Commission v. Abercrombie & Fitch Stores, in U.S. District Court by the U.S. Equal Employment Opportunity Commission, 17-year-old Samantha Elauf said she applied, in June 2008, for a sales position at the Abercrombie Kids store in the Woodland Hills Mall, located in Tulsa, Oklahoma.  The teenager, who wears a hijab in accordance with her religious beliefs, claims the manager told her the headscarf violates the store's "Look Policy". The United States Supreme Court agreed to hear the case on February 25, 2015, and ruled 8–1 on June 1, 2015, against the company.

In 2010, a Muslim woman working at a Hollister store in San Mateo, California, was fired. Before being dismissed, Hani Khan had refused Abercrombie & Fitch's human-resources representative's demand that she remove her hijab. The representative reportedly stated that the headscarf, which Khan wears for religious reasons, violated the company's "Look Policy". The Council on American-Islamic Relations has stated that the dismissal is a violation of nondiscrimination laws, and filed a complaint with the U.S. Equal Employment Opportunity Commission.

In 2011, the Belgian Centre for Equal Opportunities and Opposition to Racism started an investigation into the company's hiring and remuneration policies. The firm was suspected of only hiring personnel under 25 years old, making heavy demands on the physical appearance of its staff and rewarding a premium to male models that work shirtless.

In November 2009, the company was added to the "Sweatshop Hall of Shame 2010" by the worker advocacy group International Labor Rights Forum.

Customer issues
In 2009, the company was fined more than $115,000 by the Minnesota Department of Human Rights for refusing to let a teenage girl help her sister, who has autism, try on clothes in a fitting room. The amount of the fine reflected "pushback" by the company according to Michael K. Browne, the legal affairs manager of the Minnesota Department of Human Rights.

A 16-year-old sued the company after discovering that she was being videotaped in a changing room by an employee, Kenneth Applegate II. Applegate denied the claim, but co-workers discovered his camera days later with the video on it.

In 2010, a customer filed a class action relating to a 2009 holiday gift card promotion. The lawsuit alleges that the gift cards said "No Expiration Date" but Abercrombie voided and expired the gift cards in early 2010. In 2012, a judge certified a nationwide class in the case. In May 2013, Class Notice went out to potential class members.

Lawsuits against other parties
In 2002, the company filed a lawsuit against American Eagle Outfitters, claiming that American Eagle copied the company's garment designs, among other things. The lawsuit was based on a trade-dress claim, stating that American Eagle had very closely mimicked the company's products' visual appearance and packaging. Specifically, it claimed that American Eagle copied particular articles of clothing, in-store displays and advertisements, and even its product catalog. Despite the admission that American Eagle might have utilized very similar materials, designs, in-store displays, symbols, color combinations, and patterns as A&F, the court ruled that there was not an excessive level of similarity to confuse potential customers, and therefore the court ruled in favor of American Eagle.

On October 18, 1999, the company had a lawsuit about making false and misleading statements concerning its growth while knowing the actual growth was less than Wall Street expectations, and paid $6,050,000 for settlement.

Privacy concerns
In February 2019, TechCrunch reported that the Abercrombie & Fitch mobile app in the iOS App Store was using session-replay functionality to record users' activities and send the data to Israeli firm Glassbox without the users' informed consent, compromising users' privacy and contravening the rules of the iOS App Store.

See also
 Companies listed on the New York Stock Exchange (A)
 List of S&P 600 companies
 Lifestyle brand
 Retail apocalypse
 List of retailers affected by the retail apocalypse

References

Further reading
  Pdf.

External links

 
 
 Abercrombie & Fitch SEC Filings

 
Abercrombie & Fitch brands
Clothing brands of the United States
Clothing retailers of the United States
Underwear brands
American companies established in 1892
Clothing companies established in 1892
Retail companies established in 1892
1892 establishments in New York (state)
Companies that filed for Chapter 11 bankruptcy in 1976
Companies based in the Columbus, Ohio metropolitan area
Re-established companies
1990s fashion
2000s fashion
2010s fashion
2020s fashion
Companies listed on the New York Stock Exchange
1988 mergers and acquisitions
1996 initial public offerings